Gildo Pastor (October 6, 1910 – October 21, 1990) was a Monégasque businessman and property developer.

Life and career
Gildo Pastor was born in Monaco as the son of Jean-Baptiste Pastor, a stonemason from Liguria in Italy, who immigrated to Monte Carlo as a young man in the 1880s. He was educated at the Public Works School. In 1950, he became the Lebanese consul in Monaco.

After World War II, Pastor acquired oceanfront land at low prices, and in the 1950s, he started building apartment blocks. With a conservative, debt-averse approach, the Pastor family eventually owned some 3,000 apartments, representing 15% of Monaco's total housing stock and worth about Euro 20 billion.

Marriage and children
Pastor married Émilie Brianti on April 27, 1936. They lived in Monaco and had three children:

 Victor Pastor (1936-2002), father of:
 Philippe Pastor (1961-), artist
 Marie-Hélène (1965-)
 Jean-Victor Pastor (1968-), Director of  J.B. Pastor & Fils
 Patrice Pastor (1973-),  Chairman of J.B. Pastor & Fils
 Hélène Pastor (1937-2014), mother of:
 Sylvia Ratkowski (1961-), married to Wojciech Janowski, Polish consul in Monaco
 Gildo Pallanca Pastor (1967-), CEO and owner of Venturi Automobiles
 Michel Pastor (1943-2014), father of:
 Fabrice Pastor (from his first marriage)
 Alexandra Pastor (1976-), married to David Hallyday
 Delphine Pastor (1977-), CEO of Michel Pastor Group 
 Émilie-Sophie Pastor (1981-), Director of Michel Pastor Group 
 Jean-Baptiste Pastor (1984-), Director of Michel Pastor Group

Death and legacy
Following his death in 1990, his wealth was divided between his three children.

The Gildo Pastor Center in Fontvieille, Monaco, was named in his honor.

References 

1910 births
1990 deaths
People of Ligurian descent
Monegasque businesspeople
Monegasque billionaires
Gildo
20th-century businesspeople